The 2000 Clemson Tigers baseball team represented Clemson University in the 2000 NCAA Division I baseball season. The team played their home games at Beautiful Tiger Field in Clemson, South Carolina.

The team was coached by Jack Leggett, who completed his seventh season at Clemson.  The Tigers reached the 2000 College World Series, their ninth appearance in Omaha.

Roster

Schedule

Ranking movements

References

Clemson
Clemson Tigers baseball seasons
College World Series seasons
Clemson
Clemson